The allis shad (Alosa alosa) is a widespread Northeast Atlantic species of fish in the herring family, Clupeidae. It is an anadromous fish which migrates into fresh water to spawn.  It is found in the eastern Atlantic Ocean, the western Baltic Sea and the western Mediterranean Sea. In appearance it resembles an Atlantic herring but has a distinctive dark spot behind the gill cover and sometimes a row of up to six spots behind this. It sometimes hybridises with the twait shad (A. fallax). This fish becomes mature when three or more years old and migrates to estuaries, later swimming up rivers to spawn. Populations of this fish have declined due to overfishing, pollution and habitat destruction. Conservation of this species is covered by Appendix III of the Bern Convention  and Appendix II and V of the European Community Habitats Directive.

Description
The allis shad is a typical herring-type fish. It has no lateral line and a somewhat rounded belly. The gill cover is ridged and the scales large. The back is a bluish-green colour and the head brownish with a golden tinge on the operculum. The flanks are silvery, sometimes with a bronzy tinge=Allis shad: Alosa alosa |publisher=NatureGate |accessdate=14 December 2013}}</ref>

Distribution
The allis shad is found in the eastern Atlantic in waters bordering most of Europe and northwestern Africa, and it enters to the western Baltic and western Mediterranean Seas, but it is rare outside France.

Biology and lifecycle

Alosa alosa has a similar lifecycle to that of the twait shad A. fallax. They are known to live in sympatry, and the two species can hybridize. They are anadromous species like many other species in the genus Alosa. However, some record of them being landlocked suggests an ability to adapt well to their environment.
They primarily live at sea on feeding grounds and migrate to their spawning grounds between April and June once they are sexually mature. Maturity usually ranges from 3–7 years of age. A. alosa can usually only reproduce once in their lifetimes. Juveniles appear in estuaries and brackish water around July to August. The salinity of brackish water may pose problems to the juveniles migrating from fresh water.

Population reduction
Populations have been reduced primarily by overfishing, pollution, and habitat destruction.  The estuarine phase, or the time that they are in the estuaries migrating from spawning grounds to sea, is estimated to have a duration in A. alosa of up to six months. The estimate, however, does not take into account individual variation and/or survival of juveniles in the estuarine phase.

Conservation
Four special areas of conservation have been designated in Ireland where Alosa species have been known to spawn. Alosa alosa "has been placed in Appendix III of the Bern Convention (1979) that lists protected fauna species as well as in Appendix II and V of the European Community Habitats Directive (1992) that list, respectively, species whose conservation requires the designation of special areas of conservation and that are subject to management measures." However, A. alosa is currently under a moratorium (2008) in numerous French watersheds.

References

External links
 
 EU LIFE-Project: The re-introduction of allis shad (Alosa alosa) in the Rhine system
 

allis shad
Fauna of France
Marine fish of Europe
allis shad
allis shad
Least concern biota of Europe
Taxonomy articles created by Polbot